is a railway station in Kitami, Hokkaidō Prefecture, Japan. Its station number is A55.

Lines
 Hokkaido Railway Company
 Sekihoku Main Line

Adjacent stations

Railway stations in Hokkaido Prefecture
Railway stations in Japan opened in 2000

References